Sadiq Tagiyev (b. 1959, Tovuz, Azerbaijan) is the Former First Deputy Chairman of the Court of Appeal of the Chernigov Oblast in Ukraine, former First Deputy Chairman of the Supreme Court of Luhansk Oblast, Doctor of Law, Major-general.

Life 
He was born in 1959 in Ashagi Ayyublu village of Tovuz region.

Education 
He graduated from Donetsk National Medical University in 1977 and worked in the medical field. In 1985 he graduated from the Department of Criminalistics at the USSR Ministry of Internal Affairs. He graduated from the Faculty of Law in Kharkov University in 1987.

Activities 
In 1985, after graduating from the Department of Criminalistics at the USSR Ministry of the Internal Affairs, he worked in the police department in the Luhansk Oblast. Sadig Tagiyev, who graduated from the law faculty at Kharkov University in 1987, worked in various positions in the judicial system since 1992. Prior to joining the Chernigov Oblast Appeal Court, he served as Deputy Chairman of the Supreme Court in Luhansk Oblast.

References 

Living people
1959 births
People from Tovuz
Azerbaijani judges